Bundaberg Christian College is a Kindergarten to Year 12 school in Bundaberg, Queensland, Australia.

The school was established in 1996 and has 100+ staff members and 800+ students.

In 2016 it installed the largest hybrid solar system in Australia with an 170KW panel system and additional batteries.

Cultural 
Bundaberg Christian College has been involved in many cultural events including Eisteddfods and sporting events. The school has many bands including Junior, Senior, Year 5 and Stage, many choirs including Junior, Senior and Voiceworx and many orchestras including Junior, Senior, Year 4 and Year 8 Chamber. 
A stringed instrument is compulsory in Year 4 and a brass or woodwind in Year 5. In Year 6+ students have the option of learning percussion instruments.

Discipline
The school had a policy of corporal punishment until mid-2012, making it one of the last schools in Queensland to use this form of discipline. Paddling or caning was given for "serious verbal or physical abuse, theft or misbehaviour". In 2008 the school's paddle was used, with parental agreement, on 10 occasions.

See also 
 List of schools in Queensland

Notes

External links 
 Bundaberg Christian College website

Private schools in Queensland
High schools in Queensland
Educational institutions established in 1996
Schools in Bundaberg
1996 establishments in Australia